Susan Marie Snyder (born July 18, 1963, in Dundee, Oregon, U.S.) is an American actress.

Career
Snyder had her first acting job on Late Night with David Letterman where she appeared in a series of recurring skits.

She played Julie Snyder on CBS' soap As the World Turns. She portrayed the role from 1989 to 1995 and returned shortly twice in 1998 and 2002. Prior to joining the show, Susan had a starring role on another soap, NBC's Santa Barbara. She was the second actress to portray Laken Lockridge, from 1987 to 1988.

Snyder has starred in two feature films, in 1986 she had a brief appearance in Ruthless People, which starred Danny DeVito and Bette Midler and she played the role of Mare in 1988 sequel Sleepaway Camp II: Unhappy Campers alongside Pamela Springsteen.

Personal life
She was married to ATWT co-star Peter G. Boynton from 1989 to 1995. They have one daughter together. She has been married to Daniel Sonis since 1999. After leaving ATWT, she retired from acting and moved to Vermont. She legally changed her name to Suzenne Marie Seradwyn. She currently lives in Albuquerque, New Mexico.

Filmography

References

External links
 

American television actresses
American soap opera actresses
Living people
1964 births
People from Dundee, Oregon
21st-century American women